The Confederation of European Scouts, called in French Confédération Européenne de Scoutisme and abbreviated as CES, was formed in Brussels, Belgium, on 12 November 1978 and is still based in Belgium. CES stresses the European dimension of the Scouting programme and claims to provide the "authentic Scouting of Baden-Powell". The CES is a confederation of national federations. The CES is a split-off from the Fédération du Scoutisme Européen (FSE) later renamed to the Union Internationale des Guides et Scouts d'Europe; it left after controversies about the importance of religious elements in the single associations' programs and co-education. The exact number of members of the CES is unknown.

Member organizations
CES has national federations in:
 Belgium - Europe et Scoutisme - 10 groups (3 Sea Scout groups)
 Germany - Bund Europäischer Pfadfinder (BEP, founded 1952) - 3 groups 
 Italy - Federazione Scautistica Italiana - Federazione del Movimento Scout Italiano (FSI) - federation with one member organization:
 Associazione Scautistica Cattolica Italiana
 Lithuania - Związek Harcerstwa Polskiego na Litwie
 Netherlands - Federatie Scouting Europa Nederland (FSE) - one Rover crew 
 United Kingdom - European Scout Federation (British Association) (FSE) - at least 8 groups  - 459 members
Friend associations and corresponding members:
 Spain - Organización Juvenil Española (OJE)
 Poland - Związek Harcerstwa Rzeczypospolitej (ZHR)
 Brazil, Joinville - Associação Escoteira Independente Pirai (AESPI)

Former members
The following organizations were listed as members in 2002 and left the CES or were dissolved between 2002 and 2009:
 France - Fédération Française de Scoutisme (FFDS, founded 1970); umbrella federation
 France/Alsace - Fédération du Scoutisme Européen Alsace (FSE Alsace, all known active groups are located in Germany near Mannheim)
 France/Picardy - Guides et Scouts St Bernard
 France/Picardy - Scouts de la Forêt de Brocéliande
 France/Champagne - Scouts Libres Européens
 Spain - Confederación Española de Federaciones y Asociaciones Scouts; umbrella federation
 Spain/nationwide - Federación de Asociaciones Scouts Baden-Powell (SBP)
 Spain/Andalusia - Asociación de Guías y Scouts ASA - Andalucía (ASA)

Another former member is the Italian Federazione del Movimento Scout Italiano (until June 2006 Federazione Scautistica Italiana; FEDERSCOUT), which left the CES in 2008 joining the World Federation of Independent Scouts.

Until 1996 the CES had a member in Portugal, the Associação das Guias e Escuteiros da Europa (Guide and Scout Association of Europe), which left the CES and joined the UIGSE.

Board
2019-2022
President: Wouter Aarts (FSE-NL)
Vice-President: Verena Börger (BEP)
Secretary: Brian Cockburn (FSE-BA)
Treasurer: Maite Orens (E&S)

Emblems 

 The emblem of Europe et Scoutisme is based on the emblem of the CES,  a Fleur-de-lis with the European stars on a blue background.
 The Bund Europäischer Pfadfinder, the Federatie Scouting Europa Nederland and the European Scout Federation (British Association) use the old emblem of the FSE, a gold fleur-de-Lys on a red Cross Paté, with a blue background.
 The emblem of the Organización Juvenil Española is a gold lion on a red cross potent.

Eurojam 
The Eurojam is the Scouting jamboree of the CES.

References

External links 
 History of the "European Scouting Movement" 
 Official website of the Confédération Européenne de Scoutisme

Non-aligned Scouting organizations
International Scouting organizations
Youth organizations established in 1978